The 1999 AFL draft consisted of a pre-season draft, a national draft, a trade period, a rookie draft and rookie elevation.  The AFL draft is the annual draft of talented players by Australian rules football teams that participate in the main competition of that sport, the Australian Football League.

In 1999 there were 93 picks to be drafted between 16 teams in the national draft. The Collingwood Magpies received the first pick in the national draft after finishing on the bottom of the ladder during the 1999 AFL season.

Trades

Melbourne was also fined $600,000 and stripped of draft picks in the 2000 AFL draft.

1999 national draft

2000 pre-season draft

2000 rookie draft

Rookie elevation
In alphabetical order of professional clubs. This list details 1999-listed rookies who were elevated to the senior list; it does not list players taken as rookies in the rookie draft which occurred during the 1999/2000 off-season.

See also 
 Official AFL Draft page

References

AFL Draft
Australian Football League draft